The Work and Pensions Select Committee is a select committee of the House of Commons in the Parliament of the United Kingdom. The remit of the committee is to examine the expenditure, administration, and policy of the Department for Work and Pensions and its associated public bodies.

Membership
The full membership of the committee in the 58th Parliament is as follows:

Changes 2019-present

2017-2019 Parliament
The chair was elected on 12 July 2017, with the members of the committee being announced on 11 September 2017.

Changes 2017–2019

2015-2017 Parliament
The chair was elected on 18 June 2015, with members being announced on 8 July 2015.

Changes 2015-2017

2010-2015 Parliament
The chair was elected on 10 June 2010, with members being announced on 12 July 2010.

Changes 2010-2015

Significant inquiries 
The committee has been involved in a number of significant investigations.

Welfare safety net inquiry (2015) 
On 18 September 2015, the committee announced that it was beginning an enquiry into the 'welfare safety net'.  The committee's chair, in launching the enquiry, said:

"There is a great deal of concern that some of the least advantaged people are slipping through our safety net into a state of hunger. Our welfare safety net has developed over decades because there is a level below which we as a society do not believe anyone should fall, no matter where they live. We want to understand how local councils are adapting and coping with the changes in benefits and the extra responsibilities on them to meet genuine need and maintain that basic safety net."

Two child limit (2019)
In 2019 the Work and Pensions Select Committee recommended ending the two-child limit on welfare payments. The committee heard evidence from charities, economists and faith groups and stated the limit had, “unintended consequences that no government should be willing to accept”. The committee stated the justification for the limit assumed all pregnancies were planned, that distinguishing between families on benefits and families in work was “crude and unrealistic”, further evidence did not support the case that the two child limit might encourage parents to increase their incomes from work. The committee argued for no significant distinction between households on benefits and those working. In April 2019, 72% of families getting tax credits were in work. In May 2019, 28% of working-age housing benefit claimants were, “in employment and not on passported benefit”. in October 2019, 33% of Universal Credit claimants were recorded as employed. Frank Field MP said, “Any family in this country, except the super-rich, could fall foul of the two-child limit if their circumstances changed for the worse. This is exactly why social security must act as a national insurance scheme covering people when they’re most exposed to hardship – not increase it.”

See also
Parliamentary Committees of the United Kingdom
Department for Work and Pensions

References

External links
Work and Pensions Committee
Records for this Committee are held at the Parliamentary Archives

Select Committees of the British House of Commons
Department for Work and Pensions
Social security in the United Kingdom
Pensions in the United Kingdom
2001 establishments in the United Kingdom